Tom Donahue is an American film director and producer. His latest documentaries include This Changes Everything, which he directed and produced, about systemic gender bias and discrimination against women in Hollywood and entertainment, and HBO's Bleed Out, which he produced with Ilan Arboleda under the banner of their independent production studio, CreativeChaos vmg. The Los Angeles Press Club awarded Bleed Out with the film Best Documentary and runner-up for Best Medical/Health Reporting at its annual National Arts and Entertainment Journalism Awards and SoCal Journalism Awards in July 2019. Both films premiered in the fall of 2018. Donahue has also received much critical acclaim for directing HBO's Casting By, which was nominated for an Emmy, and Thank You for Your Service, which was released theatrically by Gathr Films in 2016. In 2010, Donahue founded the production company CreativeChaos vmg with Ilan Arboleda and Steve Edwards.

Film career

As director

Donahue co-directed an episode of the 10-part AFI series, 100 Years/100 Movies (with Linda Schaffer), which was broadcast on TNT in 1998. It was called The Antiheroes, and included interviews with Martin Scorsese, Clint Eastwood and Paul Schrader and was narrated by James Woods.  The series was executive produced by Richard Schickel and Mel Stuart. 

In 2005, Donahue directed the narrative short, Thanksgiving (starring James Urbaniak and Seymour Cassel & written by Sean Gullette).

He made his feature documentary debut with Guest of Cindy Sherman (as co-director with Paul H-O) which premiered at the 2008 Tribeca Film Festival. The film opened theatrically in March 2009 and had its broadcast premiere on the Sundance Channel in May 2009.

Nathan Lee wrote in The New York Times, "At once a fascinating behind-the-scenes glimpse, bittersweet autobiography and witty trip down art-world memory lane". John Anderson wrote in Variety,

Donahue directed the feature documentary, Casting By, which was hailed as one of the top five documentary films of 2013 by the National Board of Review and reviewed as "outstanding" by American film critic Leonard Maltin. It premiered at the 2012 Toronto International Film Festival (where it was picked up for broadcast by HBO Documentary Films). It premiered domestically at the 2012 New York Film Festival. Casting By was lauded by the Casting Society of America. The Academy of Motion Picture Arts and Sciences announced five days before Casting By'''s premiere on HBO that its Board of Governors had approved the creation of a branch for casting directors. On the night of the 29th Annual Artios Awards hosted by the Casting Society of America, the Casting By filmmakers received a standing ovation for its pivotal role in spurring Academy recognition.

In 2014, it won the Gracie Award for Outstanding Documentary of the Year from the National Alliance for Women in Media. In July 2014, the film was nominated for the News & Documentary Emmy Award for Outstanding Arts and Culture Programming.

Donahue's feature documentary, Thank You For Your Service, premiered at DOC NYC in November 2015. Called "gut-wrenching" and "important" by The New York Times, the film is an examination of failed mental health policy in the U.S. military. The film argues the creation of a Behavioral Health Corps is necessary to ensure accountability in the military chain of command toward mental health. Thank You For Your Service includes interviews with Secretary of Defense Robert Gates, General David Petraeus, General Loree Sutton, General Peter Chiarelli, Gary Sinise, Sebastian Junger and Chairman of the Joint Chiefs of Staff, Admiral Mike Mullen.  These interviews are interwoven with the experiences of four combat veterans who fought major battles while deployed in Operations Iraqi Freedom (OIF) and Enduring Freedom (OEF).

In its review, The Hollywood Reporter wrote, "If this film cannot spur politicians to act, nothing will."The Los Angeles Times review stated, "With the same clarity and fluency he brought to far sunnier material in Casting By, Donahue pinpoints the devastating intersection of personal trauma and institutional neglect in an age of perpetual war."

A CreativeChaos vmg production, the film was produced by Ilan Arboleda, Matt Tyson and Donahue in association with the Sprayregen Family Foundation and Regina K. Scully & Artemis Rising Foundation (The Invisible War, The Hunting Ground), executive-produced by Gerald Sprayregen and co-executive produced by Regina K. Scully. It won Best Documentary at the 2016 G.I. Film Festival and the Impact Award at the 2016 Illuminate Film Festival. G.I. Film Festival Co-Founder Laura Law-Millett called it "one of the most powerful, impactful films I have ever seen."

It was acquired by Gathr Films and opened theatrically in September / October 2016 in New York, Los Angeles and Washington, D.C. The American Red Cross and U.S. Senators Angus King, Patty Murray, Ron Wyden, and Joe Donnelly hosted the D.C. premiere; King and Donnelly attended and participated in a Q&A hosted by CBS' David Martin. The film had its New York premiere aboard the USS Intrepid in New York Harbor, hosted by the Thayer Leader Development Group at West Point.

U.S. Senator Angus King (I-ME) wrote about the film:

 This Changes Everything 
In September 2018, Donahue's much anticipated feature documentary This Changes Everything premiered at the Toronto International Film Festival to critical acclaim and positive audience reception, earning it the festival's first runner-up for the Grolsch People Choice Award for the documentary category. The film received multiple standing ovations and was only the second documentary to be shown in Toronto's iconic 2600-seat Roy Thomson Hall. Donahue both directed and produced the film (along with producers Ilan Arboleda of CreativeChaos vmg and Kerianne Flynn of New Plot Films). The film was created in association with Geena Davis Institute on Gender in Media, Artemis Rising Foundation, David Yurman and Lyft Entertainment. The film explores the issues surrounding gender inequality in Hollywood and has since screened in over 20 film festivals in North America and Europe.

On January 17, 2019, Deadline Hollywood announced that This Changes Everything’s theatrical, streaming and broadcast rights for North America had been acquired by Good Deed Entertainment and that the film would be released theatrically in the first half of 2019.This Changes Everything also won the Greg Gund Memorial Standing Up Competition at the Cleveland International Film Festival In April 2019. The film had its premiere on 700+ screens via Fathom Releasing on July 22nd followed by a limited theatrical release on August 9th.

On October 27, 2019, the Academy of Motion Pictures Arts and Sciences awarded Geena Davis with the Jean Hersholt Humanitarian Award for her work profiled in This Changes Everything. Lina Wertmuller (who is mentioned in the documentary as the film director that inspired Maria Giese to become a filmmaker) was also honored with a Life Achievement Award.

In her review for The New York Times, Aisha Harris called the film “passionate... a crucial Cri de Coeur” and Ashley Lee from the Washington Post called it “searing”.

Pete Hammond from Deadline called the film “powerful and fascinating”. He writes, “Some might believe that this movie especially, considering the subject matter, should be helmed by a woman. Donahue, however, is the one who got it made and feels correctly that it is as much if not more important to open the eyes of men in this regard.”

In his Variety review, Peter Debruge writes, “There’s something to be said for solidarity shown by those who have nothing to gain from their support beyond the advancement of the greater good. So, like white people at a Black Lives Matter rally or straight folks at a Gay Pride parade, Donahue deserves credit for proactively going out of his way to make a movie that tells it like it is — and paints it as it could be.” 

The film had its cable premiere on Starz on December 16, 2019.

 Los Tigres Del Norte at Folsom Prison 
In 2018, Donahue directed the Netflix Original, Los Tigres Del Norte at Folsom Prison which premiered on the streaming platform on September 15, 2019.

The band visited Folsom Prison in April 2018 to honor the 50th anniversary of Johnny Cash's legendary performance there. They performed two concerts -one for the male prisoners and one for the female (filmed the next day at the Folsom Women's Facility). Donahue and his team filmed the concerts but also interviewed 22 of the inmates (10 men and 12 women). The documentary (which includes narration by the members of the band) interweaves their stories with the songs performed.

The film was produced by Zach Horowitz (former Chairman/CEO of Universal Music Publishing Group) and Ilan Arboleda and executive produced by Horowitz. The music was produced by Gustavo Santaolalla, a two-time Oscar winner and winner of many Latin Grammys, and his production partner Anibal Kerpel. A live album was released concurrently. This was the first live album recorded at Folsom Prison since Cash's 50 years before.

The documentary was one of the most popular documentaries on Netflix in 2019 in Latin America

As producer
In 2003, Donahue produced and edited Alfredo de Villa's debut feature, Washington Heights, winner of five Best Picture awards at festivals worldwide, the Audience Award at Los Angeles Film Festival, and Special Jury Award at the TriBeCa Film Festival.  Washington Heights also received a Gotham Award nomination for the IFP Open Palm Award.

Donahue was co-producer on Ramin Bahrani's debut feature, Man Push Cart, which premiered at the 2006 Sundance Film Festival. He produced the feature documentary, Highway Courtesans (directed by Mystelle Brabbee), which had its world premiere at the International Documentary Film Festival Amsterdam and its U.S. premiere at South by Southwest.

He produced the feature film Ponies, directed by Nick Sandow (Orange Is the New Black) and starring John Ventimiglia (The Sopranos) and Kevin Corrigan. It was named a New York Times Critics Pick upon its release in 2012.

Donahue produced the 13-part documentary series On the Team for Nickelodeon. He also produced the HBO feature documentary Bleed Out alongside Ilan Arboleda and Steve Burrows. The film was directed by Burrows and premiered on December 17, 2018. Paste Magazine called it “brutal, unmissable viewing.”  The Los Angeles Press Club awarded the film Best Documentary and runner-up for Best Medical/Health Reporting at its annual National Arts and Entertainment Journalism Awards and SoCal Journalism Awards in July 2019.

As editor
Donahue's first narrative feature as editor was Raphael Nadjari's The Shade (starring Richard Edson). The film premiered at the 1999 Cannes Film Festival in the Un Certain Regard section. He also edited Raphael Nadjari's next two films, I am Josh Polonsky's Brother and Apartment#5C (which premiered as part of the 2002 Cannes Directors' Fortnight).

He edited the IFC Films feature documentary, Keep the River on Your Right based on the book of the same name by Tobias Schneebaum. The film won the 2001 Gotham Spirit Truer than Fiction Award & the Jury Prize at the International Documentary Film Festival Amsterdam.

In 2005, Donahue edited IFC's Wanderlust, a feature doc/narrative directed by Shari Springer Berman and Robert Pulcini and starring Paul Rudd and Tom McCarthy.

For television, Donahue edited several episodes of Showtime's acclaimed live action version of Ira Glass' This American Life (nominated for three Emmys in 2007). He edited the pilots for the reality series, Growing Up Gotti, I Pity the Fool, Heroes Among Us and The Cho Show and has edited episodes of Iconoclasts, Salt'N Pepa, Kimora: Life in the Fab Lane and HBO's Real Sex''.

Filmography

Features

Television

References

External links

1968 births
Living people
Film directors from New York (state)
People from Rhinebeck, New York